Journey to Ararat is a 2011 Estonian documentary film directed, written, and produced by Riho Västrik.  In the film, Västrik travels to Armenia and Turkey with Estonian scholar Erki Tammiksaar to retrace the footsteps of Baltic German explorer Friedrich Parrot and Armenian writer Khachatur Abovian on their historic ascent of Mount Ararat in 1829.  The film derives its name from Parrot's account of his expedition, Journey to Ararat. It was screened at the Golden Apricot International Film Festival in Yerevan in 2013.

References

External links
 

2011 films
2011 documentary films
2011 independent films
Estonian documentary films
Films shot in Estonia
Films shot in Armenia
Films shot in Turkey
Mount Ararat